John Delaney or Delany may refer to:

People

Politicians
 John Delaney (Bahamian lawyer) (born 1964), Bahamian lawyer and former Attorney General and Minister of Legal Affairs
 John Delaney (Florida politician) (born 1956), American lawyer, politician and university administrator
 John Delaney (Maryland politician) (born 1963), American attorney, businessman, politician, and former 2020 Democratic presidential candidate
 John Delaney (meteorologist) (1811–1883), Irish-Canadian civil servant, meteorologist and political figure in Newfoundland
 John DeLany (Wisconsin lawyer), Wisconsin lawyer, newspaperman and state representative
 John J. Delaney (1878–1948), American businessman, lawyer and U.S. Representative

Sports
 John Delaney (baseball) (born 1985), American college baseball coach
 John Delaney (football administrator) (born 1967), Irish former sports administrator
 John A. Delaney (hurler) (born 1986), Irish hurler from County Laois

Others
 John Delany (luthier) (1769–1838), Irish musical instrument and violin maker
 John Albert Delany (1852–1907), Australian conductor and composer
 John C. Delaney (1848–1915), American Civil War soldier
 John Bernard Delany, American Roman Catholic bishop
 John Delaney (businessman) (1969–2011), Irish businessman and founder of trading exchange website Intrade

Other
 John A. Delaney Student Union
 John Delaney 2020 presidential campaign

See also
 Jack Delaney (1900–1948), Canadian boxer
 Jim Delaney (1921–2012), American Olympic athlete